The Tenth Alaska State Legislature served from January 1977 to January 1979.

Senate

House

See also
 List of Alaska State Legislatures
 9th Alaska State Legislature, the legislature preceding this one
 11th Alaska State Legislature, the legislature following this one
 List of governors of Alaska
 List of speakers of the Alaska House of Representatives
 Alaska Legislature
 Alaska Senate
 AKLeg.gov

References
General

Specific and Notes

1977 establishments in Alaska
Alaska
1978 in Alaska
Alaska
1979 disestablishments in the United States
Alaska legislative sessions